The 2019 NCAA Division I women's gymnastics season will begin in January 2019 and run until the 2019 NCAA Women's Gymnastics Championship during April 19–20, 2019 at the Fort Worth Convention Center in Fort Worth, Texas. The season encompasses the 62 NCAA Division I women's gymnastics team across the United States.

Off season

Coaching changes

Teams

Big 12

Big Ten

EAGL

ECAC

MAC

MPSF

MRGC

Pac-12

SEC

References 

 
NCAA Women's Gymnastics championship
NCAA Division I women's gymnastics season
NCAA Division I women's gymnastics season
NCAA Division I women's gymnastics season